St Mary and St Nicholas Church, Beaumaris, an Anglican church, is a fourteenth century Grade I listed building in Beaumaris, Anglesey, Wales.

History
The church was founded around 1330, initially as a chapel of ease to Llandegfan, to serve the new town.

Description
It retains a 14th-century decorated nave, with four-bay arcades, although the chancel was rebuilt around 1500 in Perpendicular style.  The west tower is of four stages, with a battlemented parapet. The upper section was remodelled in the early 19th century.  The north vestry and south porch are probably nineteenth century. The exterior is mainly Perpendicular.

There are sixteenth century chancel stalls, and also the coffin and lid of Joan, wife of Llywelyn ab Iorwerth, married at the age of 15, and illegitimate daughter of King John. There are late fifteenth to early sixteenth century misericords, although with eight 1902 replacements. It is likely the old misericords came from the friary at Llan-faes.  The church also contains the tomb of William Bulkeley, (died c. 1490), deputy constable of the castle, and of his wife. This is made of Midlands alabaster. A number of monuments to leading sixteenth and seventeenth century Establishment figures (notably Sir Henry Sidney, Lord President of Wales and Lord Deputy of Ireland, a parson son of Sir Julius Caesar and a niece of George Herbert) adorn the chancel east wall. The chancel north wall contains a medieval brass plaque and a monument to an eighteenth century Viscount Bulkeley.

The clock tower has a ring of bells and the four clock faces and their mechanism are maintained by Beaumaris borough.

St Mary's and St Nicholas's is located in a large churchyard, with Church Street to the east and Steeple Lane to the west. A number of slate tombstones line the north wall of the churchyard providing detail of sociological interest (occupations etc.). A large tomb of a local polymath stands near the south porch; other slate tombstones have been destroyed near the south path due to the use of mechanical appliances.

See also  
 Grade I listed buildings in Anglesey

References

External links
Artworks at St Mary's and St Nicholas's Church, Beaumaris

14th-century church buildings in Wales
Church in Wales church buildings
Grade I listed churches in Anglesey
Saints Mary and Nicholas